Hellemyr Church is a parish church of the Church of Norway in Kristiansand Municipality in Agder county, Norway. It is located in the district of Hellemyr in the borough of Grim in the city of Kristiansand. It is the church for the Hellemyr parish which is part of the Kristiansand domprosti (arch-deanery) in the Diocese of Agder og Telemark. The white church was constructed out of concrete and expanded clay aggregate. It was built in a rectangular design in 1988 using plans drawn up by the architect Arild Lauvland. The church seats about 220 people.

The church was founded in 1988 to serve this area of the city. In 2002, the church was expanded to include several offices and other parish rooms.

See also
List of churches in Agder og Telemark

References

Churches in Kristiansand
20th-century Church of Norway church buildings
Churches completed in 1988
1988 establishments in Norway